39741 Komm, provisional designation , is a stony asteroid and eccentric Mars-crosser from the innermost regions of the asteroid belt, approximately 2 kilometers in diameter. It was discovered on 9 January 1997, by American astronomer Roy Tucker at Goodricke-Pigott Observatory in Tucson, Arizona, United States. The asteroid was named for American helioseismologist Rudolf Komm.

Orbit and classification 

Komm orbits the Sun in the inner main-belt at a distance of 1.4–2.9 AU once every 3 years and 3 months (1,178 days). Its orbit has an eccentricity of 0.35 and an inclination of 6° with respect to the ecliptic. As no precoveries were taken, the asteroid's observation arc begins with its official discovery observation.

Physical characteristics

Rotation and shape 

In October 2009, the first and so far only rotational lightcurve of Komm was obtained by French amateur astronomer René Roy. It gave a well-defined rotation period of  hours with a high brightness variation of 0.83 magnitude, indicative of a non-spheroidal shape.

Diameter and albedo 

The Collaborative Asteroid Lightcurve Link assumes a standard albedo for stony asteroids of 0.20 and calculates a diameter of 2.15 kilometers with an absolute magnitude of 15.7.

Naming 

This minor planet was named after Rudolf Walter Komm (born 1957), an American helioseismologist, who contributed in the study of solar activity. The official naming citation was published by the Minor Planet Center on 6 August 2003.

References

External links 
 Asteroid Lightcurve Database (LCDB), query form (info )
 Dictionary of Minor Planet Names, Google books
 Asteroids and comets rotation curves, CdR – Observatoire de Genève, Raoul Behrend
 Discovery Circumstances: Numbered Minor Planets (1)-(5000) – Minor Planet Center
 
 

 

039741
Discoveries by Roy A. Tucker
Named minor planets
19970109